Aoridae is a family of amphipods belonging to the order Amphipoda.

Genera

Genera:
 Aora Krøyer, 1845
 Aorella Myers, 1981
 Aoroides Walker, 1898

References

Corophiidea
Crustacean families